The Seventh Canadian Ministry was the cabinet chaired by Prime Minister Sir Charles Tupper.  It governed Canada from 1 May to 8 July 1896.  It was formed after the 7th Canadian Parliament was dissolved, and lost the 8th Canadian federal election, so it never faced a parliament.  The government was formed by the old Conservative Party of Canada.

Cabinet
Prime Minister
1 May 1896 – 11 July 1896: Sir Charles Tupper
Minister of Agriculture
1 May 1896 – 11 July 1896: Walter Humphries Montague
 Controller of Customs
1 May 1896 – 11 July 1896: John Fisher Wood
Minister of Finance
1 May 1896 – 11 July 1896: George Eulas Foster
Receiver General of Canada
1 May 1896 – 11 July 1896: The Minister of Finance (Ex officio)
1 May 1896 – 11 July 1896: George Eulas Foster
Superintendent-General of Indian Affairs
1 May 1896 – 11 July 1896: The Minister of the Interior (Ex officio)
1 May 1896 – 11 July 1896: Hugh John Macdonald
Controller of Inland Revenue
1 May 1896 – 11 July 1896: Edward Gawler Prior
Minister of the Interior
1 May 1896 – 11 July 1896: Hugh John Macdonald
Minister of Justice 
1 May 1896 – 11 July 1896: Arthur Rupert Dickey
Attorney General of Canada
1 May 1896 – 11 July 1896: The Minister of Justice (Ex officio)
1 May 1896 – 11 July 1896: Arthur Rupert Dickey
Leader of the Government in the Senate
1 May 1896 – 11 July 1896: Mackenzie Bowell
Minister of Marine and Fisheries
1 May 1896 – 11 July 1896: John Costigan
Minister of Militia and Defence
1 May 1896 – 11 July 1896: David Tisdale
Postmaster General
1 May 1896 – 11 July 1896: Louis-Olivier Taillon
President of the Privy Council
1 May 1896 – 11 July 1896: Auguste-Réal Angers
Minister of Public Works
1 May 1896 – 11 July 1896: Alphonse Desjardins
Minister of Railways and Canals
1 May 1896 – 11 July 1896: John Graham Haggart
Secretary of State of Canada
1 May 1896 – 11 July 1896: Sir Charles Tupper
Registrar General of Canada
1 May 1896 – 11 July 1896: The Secretary of State of Canada (Ex officio)
1 May 1896 – 11 July 1896: Sir Charles Tupper
Minister of Trade and Commerce
1 May 1896 – 11 July 1896: William Bullock Ives
Minister without Portfolio
1 May 1896 – 11 July 1896: Donald Ferguson
1 May 1896 – 11 July 1896: John Jones Ross
1 May 1896 – 11 July 1896: Sir Frank Smith

Offices not of the Cabinet
Solicitor-General
1 May 1896 – 11 July 1896: Sir Charles Hibbert Tupper

References

Succession

07
1896 establishments in Canada
1896 disestablishments in Canada
Cabinets established in 1896
Cabinets disestablished in 1896
Ministries of Queen Victoria